The 1890 Alabama gubernatorial election took place on August 4, 1890, in order to elect the governor of Alabama.

Results

References

1890
gubernatorial
Alabama
August 1890 events